Prince Rui may refer to any of the following princely peerages of the Qing dynasty in China:

 Prince Rui (睿), created in 1636
 Prince Rui (瑞), created in 1819